The Ballaarat Tramline, also known as the Lockville - Yoganup Railway, was the first railway in Western Australia, constructed in 1871 by the Western Australian Timber Company. The railway was used to transport timber from forests in the South West to the company's jetty at Lockville using the Ballaarat steam engine.

History

Governor Weld officially opened the railway on 23 December 1871.

The tramline was the first railway in Western Australia. It also included the Ballaarat Bridge - the first bridge constructed to conduct a steam locomotive in Western Australia.

The tramline's name originated from the locomotive that operated on the railway, named Ballaarat by the Mayor of Melbourne on the original spelling of the Victorian town of Ballarat where the locomotive was constructed.

The W.A. Timber Company was liquidated in 1888 and its assets auctioned.

In 1897 the W.A. Timber Company's former timber concession was leased to the Jarrah Wood and Saw Mills Company. The section of the Ballaarat Tramline route south of the Bunbury-Busselton railway was reused for the Nannup Branch Railway between Wonnerup and Jarrahwood.

A plaque and locomotive wheel commemorating the Ballaarat Tramline is located at Wonnerup House.

The Ballaarat steam engine now resides in Railway House, attached to the Visitor Centre on the Busselton foreshore.

References

External links
How Ballarat's 19th-century locomotive innovation became Busselton's historical treasure – ABC News article about the locomotive Ballaarat

Closed railway lines in Western Australia
South West (Western Australia)